Kangasniemi is a Finnish surname that may refer to
Antti Kangasniemi (born 1985), Finnish ice hockey player 
Kaarlo Kangasniemi (born 1941), Finnish weightlifter
Kauko Kangasniemi (1942–2013), Finnish weightlifter, brother of Kaarlo
Taisto Kangasniemi (1924–1997), Finnish wrestler
Tapio Kangasniemi (born 1979), Finnish volleyball player 

Finnish-language surnames